Alan Morris (15 July 1954 – 31 December 1998) was an English footballer. He made an appearance in The Football League for Chester and also played at Wembley Stadium for Bangor City. He played as either a midfielder or striker.

Playing career
Morris was born in Chester. As a youngster, he made his first–team debut for Chester in a Welsh Cup tie against Oswestry Town at Sealand Road in 1974–75, as the club rested several of its regular players. He then dropped into non–league football, finishing as Caernarfon Town's leading scorer in 1981–82.

Morris then had a spell with Bangor City during 1983–84 in the Alliance Premier League. The season ended with him playing at Wembley alongside fellow former Chester players Ian Howat and Peter Sutcliffe as Bangor drew 1–1 with Northwich Victoria in the final of the FA Trophy before losing the replay at Stoke.

Morris returned to Chester in the summer of 1984 and he made a belated Football League debut at the age of 30 as a substitute against Colchester United. This proved to be his only appearance in his second spell at Chester and he returned to Bangor. He was also heavily involved in local league football in Chester and worked as a stonemason at Chester Cathedral.  He was murdered outside his home in Chester on New Year's Eve 1998.

Bibliography

References

1954 births
1998 deaths
Sportspeople from Chester
English footballers
English Football League players
National League (English football) players
Association football forwards
Association football midfielders
Chester City F.C. players
Bangor City F.C. players
Caernarfon Town F.C. players
People murdered in England